The Canoe Sprint women's KL3 event at the 2020 Paralympic Games took place on 2 and 4 September 2021. Two initial heats were held. Winners advanced directly to the final. The rest went into the semifinal, where the top six also advanced to the final.

Schedule

Results

Heats
Heat 1

Heat 2

Semifinal

Final A

References

Women's KL3
Para